Justice Siva Selliah (1924–1997) was a Sri Lankan judge. He was a former justice of the Court of Appeal, judge of the High Court and a magistrate. He was also a member of the Governing Council of the University of Colombo.

He was born Sivanathan Selliah in 1924 to Nallithamby Selliah, a stockbroker in Colombo. He was educated at the Royal College, Colombo, and entered the University of Ceylon where he obtained a degree in Classics. Thereafter he chose the field of law, studying at the Colombo Law College.

After taking oaths as a lawyer, he joined the judiciary as a magistrate. Later, he became a High Court judge, and then a justice of the Court of Appeals until his retirement in 1987. After his retirement he became a member of the Governing Council of the University of Colombo and member of the Commission to Investigate Allegations of Bribery or Corruption.

Married to Bavani Selliah, his son is Dr. Sivakumar Selliah and daughters Selvalakshmi and Sivakami. Their family hails from Manipay.

References

External links 
 

Sri Lankan Tamil judges
Sri Lankan Tamil lawyers
Sri Lankan Hindus
Alumni of Royal College, Colombo
1924 births
1997 deaths
Alumni of the University of Ceylon
Alumni of Sri Lanka Law College
High Courts of Sri Lanka judges
Magistrates of Sri Lanka
Court of Appeal of Sri Lanka judges